Samuel "Sam" John Butcher (born January 1, 1939) is an American artist. He is mainly known as the artist behind the Precious Moments brand of characters based on American-Christian themes. He draws in oil, water-color, acrylic, and mixed-media.

Early life
Butcher was born in Jackson, Michigan, on January 1, 1939. He was the third of five children born to a poor family. Soon after his birth, the family moved to Redding, California.

As a young man, Butcher was a "chalkboard minister," spreading the teachings of Christianity through illustrations. This job paid very little, so he supplemented his income as a janitor.

With the guide of Reverend Royal Blue, Butcher made the decision to follow deeper into Christianity. He joined the Child Evangelism Fellowship (CEF) in Grand Rapids, Michigan. There he met Bill Biel, with whom he would start his first business, Jonathan & David (J&D). During his ten-year career with the CEF, Butcher's work was seen by millions of people through the Tree House Club television programs.

Precious Moments

In 1974, Butcher created Precious Moments drawings for J&D, which were introduced to the market a year later. Before that, Butcher created many other works, from kitsch oil paintings to comic strips. These works can be observed at the Precious Moments Chapel in Carthage, Missouri.

Prior to 1978, Sam met Eugene Freedman at a Christian trade show in Los Angeles, California.

The three major products carried by J&D were greeting cards, porcelain figurines, and vinyl dolls. J&D sourced its vinyl dolls in Asia, leading Butcher to the Philippines. In 1981 Butcher and Biel traveled to the Philippines, where they gave financial assistance to a Bible college.

Some time thereafter, Butcher and Biel ended their business relationship. J&D suspended its greeting card business, passed its porcelain products to Enesco, and stopped producing vinyl dolls.  The doll business would be relaunched as Precious Moments Country Dolls in 1989 and renamed Precious Moments Company Dolls in 1992.

Butcher founded the Samuel J. Butcher Foundation and Precious Moments, Inc. In 1989, he completed the construction of the Precious Moments Chapel on the south side of Carthage, Missouri.  The Chapel and several other museums are on the property, along with a wedding chapel and reception area. He privately funded the purchase of land on an island in Aklan and built a resort called Sampaguita Gardens. Through this resort, Butcher provides employment and training opportunities for people from Aklan and students from other provinces in Western Visayas.

Later, Butcher moved to St. Charles, Illinois, and lived with his children.

As Precious Moments became more successful, Butcher began to spend more time at his resort in the Philippines. At the height of his popularity, Butcher fell ill due to strokes brought on by self-medicating. His children brought him back to the States, where he was diagnosed with bipolar disorder and treated. He then returned to the Philippines.

Death of his sons

While Butcher was in the Philippines, his 27-year-old son Phillip was killed. Butcher was filled with grief and could not pursue his interests in art.

Butcher dealt with his grief by returning to art. He worked on paintings in what is now called Phillip's Room at the Chapel. According to Chapel employees who watched Butcher, "it was as though he was possessed by depression and anger. Finally, his body and mind could take it no more.  Sam broke down, and stopped."

Butcher's children urged their father to take better care of himself and took over all business responsibilities at PMI.  Butcher left for the Philippines for an extended period.

His son Tim Butcher died on October 14, 2012, having been the inspiration for many Precious Moments pieces. Butcher built a Belltower called "Timmy's Tower", in remembrance of his son  containing a poem Samuel wrote:

The sad loss of a loved one

Can be so hard at times

I understand because I lost

Two precious sons of mine

I lost my way and wandered

In a Valley of Despair

Because my heavy burden

Was too much for me to bear

But then I heard a still small voice

So warm and tender

It was the voice of Him, who said

"I’m here, just trust in me."

Then all at once, I felt a touch

It was the hand of God

So gentle, warm and soothing

Like a balm in Gilead

We need not be afraid my friend

When sorrow comes because

The Lord will bless us and keep us

By the power of His love.

– Samuel J. Butcher, 10-12-15

From 2012

, Sam Butcher resided in the Philippines and his sons Jon and Don controlled PMI and most of his artistic assets.

Butcher makes appearances at the Precious Moments Chapel in Carthage during the summer for Precious Moments Family Reunion events.

References

Further reading
Butcher, Jon. Interview. Jun. 2004~Oct. 2004.
Butcher, Sam & Butcher, Jon. Interview. Oct. 2004.
Siytangco-Masigan, Sandee. "workbook: Precious Faith". August 31, 2004.

External links
CIO Insight. Precious Little Time. http://www.cioinsight.com/article2/0,1540,1869514,00.asp (retrieved December 2005).
http://www.herword.com/workbook/masigan08.31.04.html

American illustrators
20th-century American painters
American male painters
21st-century American painters
American Christians
1939 births
Living people
People from Jackson, Michigan
People from Redding, California
Artists from Michigan
Artists from California
Businesspeople from Michigan
Businesspeople from California
20th-century American male artists